Javed Khan Amrohi (died 14 February 2023) was an Indian film and television actor. He started his acting career in the theater in the 1970s and then later in films. He worked in a number of theatrical productions and over 150 films in his career. He made his film debut with film Jalte Badan (1973) and then continued to play supporting roles throughout in the 1970s and 1980s, appearing in many films including hits like Satyam Shivam Sundaram, Woh 7 Din, Tridev and Aashiqui. 

Amrohi was best known for his roles in the Academy Award-nominated film Lagaan: Once Upon a Time in India (2001), Andaz Apna Apna (1994), and Chak De! India (2007). He also worked in TV series such as Mirza Ghalib, directed by Gulzar, and as Karim (the barber) in Nukkad, directed by Saeed Akhtar Mirza in the 1980s. Amrohi was also a member of the acting faculty at Zee TV‘s Zee Institute of Media Arts in Mumbai. He died from respiratory failure on 14 February 2023, at the age of 73.

Filmography

 Jalte Badan (1973) as College Student 
 Ram Bharose (1977)
 Alibaba Marjinaa (1977)
 Doosara Aadmi (1977)
 Satyam Shivam Sundaram: Love Sublime (1978) as Shastry's Son
 Prem Bandhan (1979) as Eve teaser
 Jhoota Kahin Ka (1979) as Jagjit
 Noorie (1979) as Faulad Khan
 Patthar Se Takkar (1980) as Havaldar
 Nakhuda (1981) as Nawab  (Waiter)
 Naram Garam (1981) as Chandu
 Aagaman (1982)
 Apna Bana Lo (1983) as Tebri
 Prem Rog (1982) as Kedara
 Sun Sajna (1982) as Chotu  (Gopi's brother)
 Kalka (1983 film) as Verma
 Talabandi (1983)
 Pasand Apni Apni (1983) as Maruti
 Rang Birangi (1983) as Seller Tickets in Kino
 Woh 7 Din (1983)
 Lorie (1984) as Bus Conductor
 Ram Teri Ganga Maili (1985) as Manglu
 Baadal (1985) as Vikram's Man
 Meraa Ghar Mere Bachche (1985) as Ramswarup Seksaria - Newsweek's photographer
 Faasle (1985) as Nandu
 Jhanjaar (1986) as Pujari
 Jaal (1986) as Gundhu
 Pahuche Huwey Log (1986) as Murari
 Gharwali Baharwali (1988 film) ...Dinu Servant
 Pyaar Ka Mandir (1988) as PatientWaaris (1988) as Chhotey
 Guru (1989 film) 
 Hathyar (1989 film)  as Pickpocketer
 Tridev (1989) as Ramu
 Baap Numbri Beta Dus Numbri (1990)
 Aashiqui (1990) as Uncle Peter
 Baaghi (1990) as Col Sood Servant
 Saathi (1991 film) as Beer Bar Tender
 Sadak (1991) as Pakya (Prakash)
 Abhi Abhi (1992) as Driver
 Ek Ladka Ek Ladki (1992) as Police Constable
 Bol Radha Bol (1992) as Postman
 Insaaf Ka Khoon (1993)
 Platform (1993)
 Hum Hain Rahi Pyar Ke (1993) as Thief
 Santaan (1993) as Postman
 Laadla (1994) as Employee
 Andaz Apna Apna (1994) as Anand Akela
 Inteqam Ke Sholay (1995)
 Coolie No. 1 (1995) as Driver who rejects Govinda's marriage proposal
 Sarhad: The Border of Crime (1995) as Kapadia, Bank Branch Manager
 Bade Miyan Chote Miyan (1998) as Constable who brought in Sharafat Ali
 Hello Brother (1999)
 Chal Mere Bhai (2000) as Murari
 Lagaan: Once Upon a Time in India (2001) as Ram Singh
 Ek Aur Ek Gyarah: By Hook or by Crook  (2003) as Raju Nepali
 Shaadi No. 1 (2005) as Marriage Registrar
 Kyon Ki... (2005) as Inmate #33
 Tom, Dick, and Harry (2006) as Soprano's assistant
 Phir Hera Pheri (2006) as Havaldar
 Umrao Jaan (2006) as Peer Baksh
 Chak De! India (2007) as Sukhlal
 Dhoom Dadakka (2008)
 Coffee House (2009)
 Sadak 2 (2020) as Pakya

TV Series
 Yeh Jo Hai Zindagi (1984) as Jhumroo (servant)
 Nukkad (1986) as Karim Hajaam (barber)
 Mirza Ghalib (1988)
 Kuch Bhi Ho Sakta Hai (1995) 
 Ghar Jamai (1997) as Hotel receptionist (Guest role only in episode no 42)
 Powder (TV series) as Advocate Siddiqui
 Kirdaar (TV series) as Various Role
 Vishnu Puran(TV series) as Rishi Vishwamitra
 Shaktimaan (1998) as thief

References

External links
 
 
 

1962 births
2023 deaths
Male actors in Hindi cinema
Indian male film actors
Indian male television actors
Film and Television Institute of India alumni
Indian drama teachers
Acting teachers
Male actors from Mumbai
20th-century Indian male actors
21st-century Indian male actors
People from Amroha